Claus' benzene (C6H6) is a hypothetical hydrocarbon and an isomer of benzene. It was proposed by Adolf Karl Ludwig Claus in 1867 as a possible structure for benzene at a time when the structure of benzene was still being debated. The molecule can be described as a hexagon with carbon atoms positioned at the corners, with each carbon connected to its two ortho carbons (the nearest carbons) and the one para carbon connected diametrically. High strain energy makes its synthesis impossible. Although it is often referred to alongside Dewar benzene and prismane, it is not possible to synthesise it, while Dewar benzene and prismane can be.

References

Isomerism
Hypothetical chemical compounds